Malo Tinje is a small village in the Pohorje Hills in the Municipality of Slovenska Bistrica in northeastern Slovenia. The area is part of the traditional region of Styria. It is now included with the rest of the municipality in the Drava Statistical Region.

A small chapel in the settlement was built in 1931.

References

External links
Malo Tinje at Geopedia

Populated places in the Municipality of Slovenska Bistrica